{{Infobox language
| name = Hill Mari
| altname = Western Mari
| nativename = , Kyryk mary jÿlmÿ
| states = Russia
| region = Mari El (Gornomariysky, Yurinsky, Kilemarsky districts)
| speakers = 30,000
| date = 2012
| ref = e18
| familycolor = Uralic
| fam2 = Mari
| fam3 = Western Mari
| nation = 
| iso3 = mrj
| glotto = kozy1238
| glottorefname = Kozymodemyan
| map = Lang Status 40-SE.svg
| mapcaption = 
}}

Hill Mari or Western Mari (Mary jÿlmÿ'') is a Uralic language closely related to Northwestern Mari and Meadow Mari. With the first of them Hill Mari joins a Western Mari group. Hill Mari is spoken in the Gornomariysky, Yurinsky and Kilemarsky districts of Mari El, Russia. It is written using the Hill Mari Cyrillic script and is co-official with Russian and Meadow Mari in the Mari El Republic.

Alphabet

See also
Valeri Alikov

Bibliography
 Nadezhda Krasnova, Tatiana Yefremova, Timothy Riese, Jeremy Bradley. Reading Hill Mari through Meadow Mari. Vienna, 2017. 
 Юадаров К. Г. Горномарийский язык: (учебное пособие для учителей родного языка, студентов). Йошкар-Ола, 1997.
 Саваткова А. А. Словарь горного наречия марийского языка. Йошкар-Ола, 1981.
 Шорин В. С., Маро-русский словарь горного наречия, Казань, 1920;
 Коведяева, Е. И. "Горномарийский вариант литературного марийского языка", Языки мира: Уральские языки. Moscow, 1993: 164-173.

References

External links

Pictures of Gornomariysky District 
 Hill Mari - Finnish dictionary (robust finite-state, open-source)

Mari language
Languages of Russia
Culture of Mari El